HTPS may refer to:

 Harduaganj Thermal Power Station, at Qasimpur Power House Colony, Uttar Phtpsradesh, India
 Hardyston Township Public Schools, in Sussex County, New Jersey, United States; see Hardyston Township School District
 Hillsborough Township Public Schools, in Somerset County, New Jersey, United States; see Hillsborough Township School District

See also 
 HTP (disambiguation)
 HTTPS